Ramachandran Balasubramanian (born 15 March 1951) is an Indian mathematician and was Director of the Institute of Mathematical Sciences in Chennai, India. He is known for his work in number theory, which includes settling the final g(4) case of Waring's problem in 1986.

His works on moments of Riemann zeta function is highly appreciated and he was a plenary speaker from India at ICM in 2010. He was a visiting scholar at the Institute for Advanced Study in  1980-81.

Awards and honours
He has received the following awards:
The Shanti Swarup Bhatnagar Prize for Science and Technology in 1990.
The French government's Ordre National du Mérite for "furthering Indo-French cooperation in the field of mathematics" in 2003.
The Padma Shri, the fourth highest civilian award in India, in 2006.
Fellow of the American Mathematical Society, 2012.
The Lifetime Achievement Award, 2013 awarded by Manmohan Singh, the Prime Minister of India.
Fellow of the Indian National Science Academy (1988)

References

External links
 R. Balasubramian's homepage
 His CV

20th-century Indian mathematicians
Recipients of the Padma Shri in science & engineering
Living people
Fellows of the Indian National Science Academy
Tata Institute of Fundamental Research alumni
Institute for Advanced Study visiting scholars
Fellows of the American Mathematical Society
Fellows of the Indian Academy of Sciences
1951 births
Recipients of the Shanti Swarup Bhatnagar Award in Mathematical Science